Simón Moreno Barroso (born 2 July 1997) is a Spanish footballer who plays as a forward for CD Mirandés.

Club career
Born in Cartaya, Huelva, Andalusia, Moreno joined Villarreal CF's youth setup at the age of nine. He made his senior debut with the C-team on 22 August 2015, coming on as a second-half substitute for Mario González in a 1–1 Tercera División away draw against UD Alzira.

Moreno scored his first senior goal on 22 November 2015, netting the opener in a 2–2 home draw against FC Jove Español San Vicente. He was promoted to the reserves in July 2017, and was the club's top goalscorer during the 2018–19 campaign with 13 goals.

On 27 June 2019, Moreno was loaned to Segunda División side UD Almería, for one year. On 3 September, however, his loan was terminated after the club suffered a change of ownership; he subsequently close to a loan deal with Málaga CF also in the second division, but the move did not materialize, and he was assigned back at Villarreal's B-side.

In November 2019, Moreno suffered an anterior cruciate ligament injury, being sidelined for the remainder of the season. The following 12 August, he joined second division newcomers FC Cartagena on a one-year loan deal.

Moreno made his professional debut on 13 September 2020, starting in a 0–0 away draw against Real Oviedo. His loan was cut short the following 1 February, and he moved to fellow league team CD Mirandés also in a temporary deal just hours later.

Moreno scored his first professional goal on 13 March 2021, netting his team's second in a 2–2 home draw against RCD Espanyol. On 5 July, he signed a permanent contract with the Rojillos.

Personal life
Moreno's elder brother Joselu is also a footballer and a forward. He too was groomed at Villarreal.

References

External links
 
 
 

1997 births
Living people
Sportspeople from the Province of Huelva
Spanish footballers
Footballers from Andalusia
Association football forwards
Segunda División players
Segunda División B players
Tercera División players
Villarreal CF C players
Villarreal CF B players
UD Almería players
FC Cartagena footballers
CD Mirandés footballers
Spain youth international footballers